Andrea Garosio (born 6 December 1993) is an Italian cyclist, who currently rides for UCI ProTeam . In May 2019, he was named in the startlist for the 2019 Giro d'Italia.

Major results

2010
 1st Trofeo Emilio Paganessi
 6th Overall Giro della Lunigiana
 6th Overall Tre Ciclista Bresciana
 9th Trofeo Buffoni
 10th Trofeo San Rocco
2011
 4th Overall Giro della Lunigiana
 7th Overall Tre Ciclista Bresciana
2013
 10th Coppa della Pace
2014
 5th Trofeo Alcide Degasperi
2017
 3rd Giro del Medio Brenta
2018
 7th Overall Giro della Regione Friuli Venezia Giulia
2019
 10th Coppa Agostoni
2021
 1st  Mountains classification, Okolo Slovenska
 9th Overall Adriatica Ionica Race
2022
 1st  Mountains classification, Settimana Internazionale di Coppi e Bartali
 3rd Giro del Medio Brenta
 5th Overall Giro della Friuli Venezia Giulia
 5th Trofeo Città di Brescia
 8th Per sempre Alfredo

Grand Tour general classification results timeline

References

External links

1993 births
Living people
Italian male cyclists
Cyclists from Brescia